Wigner distribution or Wigner function may refer to:

 Wigner quasiprobability distribution (what is most commonly intended by term "Wigner function"): a quasiprobability distribution used in quantum physics, also known at the Wigner-Ville distribution
 Wigner distribution function, used in signal processing, which is the time-frequency variant of the Wigner quasiprobability distribution
 Modified Wigner distribution function, used in signal processing
 Wigner semicircle distribution, a probability function used in mathematics

See also
Breit–Wigner distribution (disambiguation)
Wigner D-matrix, an irreducible representation of the rotation group SO(3)